Loxosporopsis is a fungal genus in the family Pertusariaceae. The genus is monotypic, containing the single crustose lichen species Loxosporopsis corallifera, found in northwestern North America.

References

Pertusariales
Taxa described in 1995
Monotypic Lecanoromycetes genera
Lichen genera
Taxa named by Aino Henssen